The 2006 WCHA Men's Ice Hockey Tournament was the 47th conference playoff in league history and 52nd season where a WCHA champion was crowned. The 2006 tournament played between March 10 and March 18, 2006 at five conference arenas and the Xcel Energy Center in St. Paul, Minnesota. By winning the tournament, North Dakota was awarded the Broadmoor Trophy and received the Western Collegiate Hockey Association's automatic bid to the 2006 NCAA Men's Division I Ice Hockey Tournament.

Format
The first round of the postseason tournament featured a best-of-three games format. All ten conference teams participated in the tournament. Teams were seeded No. 1 through No. 10 according to their final conference standing, with a tiebreaker system used to seed teams with an identical number of points accumulated. The top five seeded teams each earned home ice and hosted one of the lower seeded teams.

The winners of the first round series advanced to the Xcel Energy Center for the WCHA Final Five, the collective name for the quarterfinal, semifinal, and championship rounds. The Final Five uses a single-elimination format. Teams were re-seeded No. 1 through No. 5 according to the final regular season conference standings, with the top three teams automatically advancing to the semifinals.

Conference standings
Note: GP = Games played; W = Wins; L = Losses; T = Ties; PTS = Points; GF = Goals For; GA = Goals Against

Bracket
Teams are reseeded after the first round

Note: * denotes overtime period(s)

Quarterfinals

(1) Minnesota vs. (10) Alaska-Anchorage

(2) Denver vs. (9) Minnesota-Duluth

(3) Wisconsin vs. (8) Michigan Tech

(4) North Dakota vs. (7) Minnesota State

(5) Colorado College vs. (6) St. Cloud State

Quarterfinal

(6) St. Cloud State vs. (9) Minnesota-Duluth

Semifinals

(1) Minnesota vs. (6) St. Cloud State

(3) Wisconsin vs. (4) North Dakota

Third Place

(1) Minnesota vs. (3) Wisconsin

Championship

(4) North Dakota vs. (6) St. Cloud State

Tournament awards

All-Tournament Team
F Brock Hooton (St. Cloud State)
F T. J. Oshie (North Dakota)
F Ryan Potulny (Minnesota)
D Kyle Klubertanz (Wisconsin)
D Matt Smaby (North Dakota)
G Jordan Parise* (North Dakota)
* Most Valuable Player(s)

See also
Western Collegiate Hockey Association men's champions

References

External links
WCHA.com
2005–06 WCHA Standings
2005–06 NCAA Standings

WCHA Men's Ice Hockey Tournament
Wcha Men's Ice Hockey Tournament